Joseph "Joe" Roy Schomacker (born March 25, 1986) is an American politician serving in the Minnesota House of Representatives since 2011. A member of the Republican Party of Minnesota, Schomacker represents District 21A in the southwestern corner of the state, which includes the cities of Luverne and Pipestone and parts of Cottonwood, Lincoln, Murray, Nobles, Pipestone, and Rock Counties.

Early life, education and career
Schomacker graduated from Luverne Senior High School in Luverne and from Southwest Minnesota State University in Marshall, earning his B.A. in public administration, speech communication and political science in 2008. He served as the university's student body president in 2007-08. In 2010, he earned his M.P.S. online from George Washington University. He is an independent public relations consultant.

Minnesota House of Representatives
Schomacker was elected to the Minnesota House of Representatives in 2010 and has been reelected every two years since. In 2010, he defeated former representative and DFL House Majority Leader Ted Winter for the seat being vacated by incumbent Doug Magnus, who opted to run for an open Minnesota Senate seat.

Schomacker served as an assistant minority leader during the 2013-14 legislative session. In 2015-16 he chaired the Aging & Long-Term Care Policy Committee, and in 2017-18 he chaired the Health & Human Services Reform Committee. Schomacker is the minority lead on the Health Finance and Policy Committee and sits on the Economic Development Finance and Policy and Ways and Means Committees.

Electoral history

References

External links 

 Rep. Schomacker Web Page
 Project Votesmart - Rep. Joe Schomacker Profile
 Joe Schomacker Campaign Web Site

1986 births
Living people
People from Luverne, Minnesota
Republican Party members of the Minnesota House of Representatives
21st-century American politicians